Gene Davis (born July 2, 1945) is a former Democratic member of the Utah Senate, representing the 3rd District from 1999 to 2022. He previously served in the Utah House of Representatives from 1987 to 1998.

Personal life, education, and career
Davis graduated from South High School. He then received his Bachelor of Laws from LaSalle Extension University and his Radio Operational Engineering (Electrical Engineering) degree. He worked in public relations and advertising. Davis went to high school where he meet his future wife Penny. They wedded in 1971 and were married for 45 years before Penny's passing in 2015. They have two children and six grandchildren.

In 2021, Davis was accused of sexual harassment by a Utah Capitol staffer.

Political career
Davis has served on the Sugarhouse Community Council as the past chair. He is also the past president for the Sugarhouse Rotary. Davis served in the House of Representatives from January 1, 1987 - December 31, 1998. He was elected to the Senate in 1998. In 2012, Senator Davis was elected as the Minority Leader in the senate.

In 2016, Senator Davis served on the following committees:
Business, Economic Development, and Labor Appropriations Subcommittee
Executive Appropriations Committee
Retirement and Independent Entities Appropriations Subcommittee
Senate Business and Labor Committee
Senate Ethics Committee (Vice Chair)
Senate Retirement and Independent Entities Committee
Senate Revenue and Taxation Committee
Senate Judiciary, Law Enforcement, and Criminal Justice Committee

Electoral history
In 2022, Davis lost to Democratic candidate Nate Blouin in the primary election.

In 2014 Davis ran unopposed in the primary and general election.

Legislation

2016 sponsored bills

Notable legislation 
In 2016 Senator Davis sponsored the bill SB77, which would have created full medicaid expansion for the state under the Affordable Care Act. The bill did not pass, instead Representative Dunnigan's health care bill HB437 passed.

References

External links
Utah State Legislature - Senator Gene Davis  official government website
Project Vote Smart - Senator Gene Davis (UT) profile
Gene Davis campaign contributions - Follow the Money

1945 births
21st-century American politicians
Businesspeople from Salt Lake City
Living people
Democratic Party members of the Utah House of Representatives
Politicians from Salt Lake City
Democratic Party Utah state senators